The Suaedoideae are a subfamily of plants in the family Amaranthaceae (now including the former family Chenopodiaceae).

Description 
The Suaedoideae have well-developed leaves. Except for genus Bienertia, the leaves show a central and many lateral vascular bundles. The leaves are neither decurrent nor amplexicaul.

The inflorescences are axillary cymes. The flowers are sitting free in the axils of bracts, with lateral bracteoles. The perianth consists of 5 tepals, which are more or less fused basally. 5 stamens are present. The seed encloses a spiral embryo, mostly without any perisperm.

Distribution 
The Suaedoideae have a nearly worldwide distribution. They are important members of the vegetation of shores and salty inland habitats. They are especially common in dry (arid) regions.

Photosynthesis pathway 
Among the species of Suaedoideae, there are nearly equal numbers of C3-plants and C4-plants. During the evolution of the subfamily, the C4-photosynthesis pathway seems to have been derived from four independent origins: two times with Kranz C4 anatomy in Suaeda section Salsina and Suaeda section Schoberia. Two independent origins of non-Kranz C4 systems are found in Bienertia and Suaeda section Borszczowia. In these plants, the photosynthesis pathways are located without spatial separation in a "single cell C4" type.

Systematics 

According to phylogenetic research by Kapralov et al. (2006), the Suaedoideae are grouped in 2 tribes: 
 Tribus Bienertieae Ulbr., with only one genus:
 Bienertia Bunge ex Boiss., with 3 species:
 Bienertia cycloptera Bunge ex Boiss.
 Bienertia sinuspersici Akhani 
 Bienertia kavirense Akhani 
 Tribus Suaedeae, with only one genus: 
 Suaeda Forssk. ex J.F.Gmel. (inclusive Alexandra Bunge and Borszczowia Bunge). With about 82 species, nearly worldwide. The genus can be further divided:
 subgenus Brezia (Moq.) Freitag & Schütze
 section Brezia (Moq.) Volk
 subgenus Suaeda
 section Alexandra (Bunge) Kapralow et al.
 section Borszczowia (Bunge) Freitag & Schütze
 section Physophora Iljin
 section Salsina Moq. s.l. (sensu Schütze et al.)
 section Schanginia (C.A.Meyer) Volk
 section Schoberia (C.A.Meyer) Volk
 section Suaeda

See also
Halophyte

References

External links

Amaranthaceae
Caryophyllales subfamilies